Bilhorod Kyivskyi or Belgorod Kievsky was a legendary city-castle located in Kievan Rus' that was located on the right bank of Irpin River (now located in Ukraine) and was mentioned in chronicles.

History
The city was quite prominent in the 10th-12th centuries but ceased to exist after 1240 destruction of Kyiv by the Mongols. Currently there is a large village of Bilohorodka, Kyiv Oblast near the location of the defunct city.

The city is first mentioned in chronicles in 980. In 991 Vladimir I of Kiev built his castle there. According to the chronicle Bilhorod was the favourite residence of Vladimir I who moved a lot of his people there including his three hundred concubines. The right bank of the Irpin River was the land of Drevlians who resisted Kievan Princes, thus, establishment of the castle might be intended to consolidate the power of Kyiv over the Drevlians. The castle also protected Kyiv from the nomads of the Great Steppe.

In 997 the new castle survived the long siege by the Pechenegs and protected Kyiv from Pecheneg conquest. According to the Primary Chronicle there was a famine in the city during the siege and the residents assembled a veche or assembly to decide whether they should surrender to pechenegs. Veche decided to continue the defence of the city that eventually led to the victory. It was the first mention of veche in Kievan chronicles. Later veche became the main form of government in Novgorod Republic and other states in the Northern Rus'.

In the 11th century the city became a bishop seat. Bilhorod bishop was first mentioned in Primary Chronicle in 1088. In the 12th century the city plays the same role as earlier Pereiaslav and Novgorod: it became the seat of the heir of the Grand Duke of Kiev. Since Bilhorod was very close to Kyiv the Grand Duke could control his heir and the heir could move to Kyiv on a very short notice if required. The tradition started with Vladimir II Monomakh who transferred there his son Mstyslav in 1117. Mstyslav became the Grand Duke of Kyiv is 1125. In 1140 the city was taken by Vsevolod II of Kiev who gave it to his brother, Sviatoslav Olgovich. In 1146 Bilhorod was taken by Iziaslav II of Kiev who became the Grand Duke of Kyiv in 1151. In 1159 Bilhorod became the seat of Mstislav II of Kiev who became the Grand Duke of Kyiv in 1167.

The most prosperity the city achieved was under Rurik Rostislavich, the ruler of Kievan Rus, who made the city his capital. In the 13th century after the Mongol invasion of Rus' Bilhorod degraded and after destruction of Kyiv in 1240 Bilhorod ceased to exist. There is still the small village Bilohorodka near the ruins of the city that keeps its name.

The ruins of the city (the Horodyshche) is a place of important archaeological excavation. Most of it is not excavated yet. The area of Horodyshche is 110 hectares. According to historian A. Chlenov the place is particularly important as it is: 1) The only drevlian fortress surviving almost intact (with its walls, etc.); 2) The only fortress of 10th century Rus of such preservation; 3) The biggest survived fortress of that epoch.

Gallery

Sources
 Мезенцева Г.Г. Дослідження Київського університету в Білгородці. – Матеріали 13-ї конференції Ін-ту археології АН УРСР, К., 1972 р., с. 324 – 325.
 Мезенцева Г.Г. Дослідження древнього Білгорода. – 15-а наукова конференція Інституту археології АН УРСР, К., 1972 р., с. 334 – 336.
 Кучера М.П. Звіт про роботу розвідзагону по обстеженню городищ Київщини у 1973 р. // НА ІА НАН України. — 1973/18а.
 Ліньова Є.А. Давньоруське м. Білгород // Археологія. — № 48. — К., 1984. 
 Ліньова Є.А. Гончарне виробництво на посаді Білгорода-Київського // Вісник КДУ: Історичні науки. — вип.22. — Київ. — 1980. — с.80-91;
 Непомящих В.Ю. Білгород-Київський: питання історіографії // Проблеми археології Середнього Подніпров'я. — Фастів, 2005. — С. 314—319.
 Непомящих В.Ю. Житлобудування Білгорода-Київського за результатами археологічних досліджень. // Стародавній Іскоростень і слов'янські гради. — Т. 2. — Коростень, 2008.
 Непомящих В.Ю. Палеоботанічні знахідки з Білгорода-Київського (за результатами археологічних досліджень 1972 та 1976 рр.) // Середньовічні міста Полісся. Археологія і давня історія України. Вип. 11. Київ. 2013. – С. 127–133.
 Непомящих В.Ю. Вивчення та датування культурних нашарувань Білгорода-Київського // Південноруське місто у системі міжцивілізаційних контактів. Археологія і давня історія України № 4 (21). – Київ, 2016. – С. 93–103.
 Непомящих В.Ю. Білгород-Київський: питання виникнення // Емінак: науковий щоквартальник. – 2017. – № 1 (17). – Т. 1. – С. 5–11.
 Непомящих В.Ю. Білгород Київський (Х — перша половина ХІІІ ст.). – Кваліфікаційна наукова праця на правах рукопису – Інститут археології НАН України, — Київ, — 2017.
 Асєєв Ю. Собор Апостолів у Білгороді // Образотворче мистецтво. — № 1. — Київ, 1970. — С. 32—33.

References

Kievan Rus'
Former castles in Ukraine
Buildings and structures in Kyiv Oblast
Archaeological sites in Ukraine
Former buildings and structures in Ukraine
Rus' settlements